Minor league baseball teams were based in Fitchburg, Massachusetts between 1877 and 1929. Fitchburg minor league teams played as members of the New England Association in 1877 and 1895, the New England League in 1899, 1914–1915 and 1919, the Eastern League in 1922 and New England League in 1929. Fitchburg hosted minor league home games ad the Fitchburg Driving Park.

The legendary athlete Jim Thorpe played for the 1922 Fitchburg Boosters.

History
In 1877, minor league baseball began in Fitchburg, Massachusetts. The Fitchburg team was a charter member of the eight–team New England Association. The Fitchburg team's 1877 final record, roster and statistics are unknown, as the team folded during the season.

The 1895 "Fitchburg" team became members of the reformed six–team New England Association. On June 20, 1895, Fitchburg had compiled a 12–25 record, playing under managers William Dwyer and William Laverty, when the team folded. The New England Association permanently folded on July 8, 1895.

"Fitchburg" resumed minor league play as members of the 1899 New England League, but relocated during the season. On May 24, 1899, Fitchburg had a record of 3–7 when the team moved to Lawrence. Playing under manager Ed Norton, the Fitchburg/Lawrence team had an overall record of 3–14 when the franchise disbanded on June 1, 1899.

In 1914, Fitchburg rejoined the eight–team Class B level New England League, with the team relocating during the season and finishing last in the standings. On July 30, 1914, the Fitchburg Burghers had a record of 24–52 when the franchise moved to Manchester, New Hampshire, finishing the season as the Manchester Textiles. After a 12–35 record while based in Manchester, the Fitchburg/Manchester team finished the season with an overall record of 36–87 to place 8th in the final league standings. Playing under manager Fred Lake, Fitchburg/Manchester finished 48.0 games behind the 1st place Lawrence Barristers. 

The Fitchburg use of the "Burghers" moniker corresponds phonetically and the word refers to a Burgher being a "privileged citizen" in medieval times. 

On May 25, 1914, it was reported Fitchburg was defeated by the Lowell Grays by the score of 5–3. Lowell pitcher Jimmy Ring made his first professional career start and threw a compete game five–hitter for Lowell.

The 1915 Fitchburg Burghers franchise resumed New England League play, despite relocating the previous season, as the Manchester Textiles franchise also continued play. The Burghers again finished last in the standings. Fitchburg ended the season with a record of 46–89 to place 8th, playing under manager Hugh McCune. The Burghers finished 28.0 games behind the 1st place Portland Duffs in the final standings. After the 1915 season, the New England League folded.

The 1919 New England League resumed play as a six-team league. The Fitchburg Foxes placed 3rd in the reformed Class B level league, after the league stopped play on August 2, 1919. The Foxes had a record of 31–36, playing under managers John F. Quinn, Bill Phoenix and Bill Page. Fitchburg was 9.0 games behind the 1st place Lowell Grays franchise when the league folded.

The Fitchburg Boosters resumed play in 1922. Playing as members of the eight team Class A level Eastern League, Fitchburg relocated during the season as the combined team finished last in the standings. On July 30, 1922, Fitchburg moved to Worcester, Massachusetts with a record of 18–46. After an 29–59 record playing in Worcester, the Fitchburg/Worcester team finished with an overall record of 47–105, to place 8th in the standings. The team was managed by Jack Mack and John Flynn, finishing 54.0 games behind the 1st place New Haven Indians. Olympic Champion, former major league player and Pro Football Hall of Fame member Jim Thorpe played for the 1922 Boosters, in his final professional baseball season at age 35. It was reported that Thorpe was recruited to Fitchburg by team owner John Kiernan after being released by the Hartford Senators of the Eastern League. Thorpe hit .344 for the season, 2nd in the league, adding 9 home runs in 96 games.

In 1929, Fitchburg played in their final minor league season. The Fitchburg Wanderers had a short appearance as members of the Class B New England League. On July 28, 1929, the Haverhill Hillies moved to Fitchburg with a record of 11–10. After compiling a record of 5–20 while based in Fitchburg, the team relocated to become the Gloucester Hillies on August 25, 1929. the Haverhill/Fitchburg/Gloucester team ended the regular season with an overall record of 39–79. The team placed 8th in the standings, playing under managers Jack Driscoll and William McDonough. The combined team finished 37.5 games behind the 1st place Manchester Blue Sox. The New England League reduced to six teams in 1930, folding the Gloucester team.

Fitchburg, Massachusetts has not hosted another minor league team.

The ballpark
The Fitchburg minor league teams were reported to played home games at the Fitchburg Driving Park. Reportedly, manager Fred Lake created a batters eye on the 1914 outfield fence, as the rest of the fence had advertisements. It was noted the ballpark was also known as the "Summer Street Grounds."

Timeline

Year-by-year records

Notable alumni

Jim Adams (1899)
Bill Clay (baseball) (1915)
Wilson Collins (1915)
Fred Donovan (1895)
Rich Durning (1915)
Alex Gaston (1915)
Tom Hart (1895)
Nat Hickey (1922)
Jack Hoey (1915)
Pat Kilhullen (1914)
Fred Lake (1914, MGR)
Al Lawson (1895)
Axel Lindstrom (1922)
Dick Loftus (1919)
Bill Magee (1895)
Allie Moulton (1915)
Dominic Mulrenan (1915, 1922)
Connie Murphy (1899)
Frederick V. Ostergren (1914)
Kewpie Pennington (1915)
Pop Smith (1899)
Jim Thorpe (1922) Pro Football Hall of Fame
Red Torphy (1914)

See also
Lawrence Barristers players
Fitchburg (minor league baseball) players
Fitchburg Foxes players

References

External links
 Baseball Reference

Minor league baseball history